There are at least 38 named trails in Glacier County, Montana according to the U.S. Geological Survey, Board of Geographic Names.  A trail is defined as: "Route for passage from one point to another; does not include roads or highways (jeep trail, path, ski trail)."

 Boulder Ridge Trail, el.  
 Boundary Trail, el.  
 Buttercup Park Trail, el.  
 Cosley Lake Cutoff Trail, el.  
 Cracker Lake Trail, el.  
 Cutoff Trail, el.  
 Dawson Pass Trail, el.  
 Dry Fork Trail, el.  
 Firebrand Pass Trail, el.  
 Gable Pass Trail, el.  
 Glacier Park Autumn Creek Trail, el.  
 Grinnell Glacier Trail, el.  
 Gunsight Pass Trail, el.  
 Helen Lake Trail, el.  
 Hidden Lake Trail, el.  
 Iceberg Lake Trail, el.  
 Jackson Glacier Trail, el.  
 Many Falls Trail, el.  
 Medicine Grizzly Trail, el.  
 Mount Henry Trail, el.  
 North Boundary Trail, el.  
 North Fork Belly River Trail, el.  
 Piegan Pass Trail, el.  
 Ptarmigan Trail, el.  
 Red Eagle Trail, el.  
 Redgap Pass Trail, el.  
 Saint Mary Lake Trail, el.  
 Siyeh Bend Cut-Off Trail, el.  
 Siyeh Pass Trail, el.  
 South Shore Trail, el.  
 Stoney Indian Pass Trail, el.  
 Swiftcurrent Pass Trail, el.  
 Triple Divide Trail, el.  
 Two Medicine Pass Trail, el.  
 Two Medicine-Elk Calf Mountain National Recreation Trail, el.  
 Upper Two Medicine Trail, el.  
 Water Ouzel Trail, el.  
 Waterton Valley Trail, el.

Further reading

See also
 List of trails of Montana
 Trails of Yellowstone National Park

Notes

Geography of Glacier County, Montana
 Glacier County
Transportation in Glacier County, Montana